Captain Lionel Wigram (1907 in Sheffield, England – 3 February 1944 in Pizzoferrato Abruzzi Region, Italy) was a British Army officer. He played a significant part in developing British infantry fighting tactics in the Second World War.

Early years

The son of Maurice Wigram, Lionel Wigram was born in Sheffield into a distinguished Jewish family, and later moved to Surrey, becoming a London solicitor and property developer. Wigram was educated at King Edward VII School in Sheffield from 1918 to 1925 and The Queen's College, Oxford. He was married to Olga Wigram née Jokelson and the couple had a daughter, Denia. She was the first wife of Peter Palumbo, the property developer.

Second World War

In 1939, like many thousands of his contemporaries, Lionel Wigram joined the British army at the outbreak of the war. Already commissioned in the Territorial Army, he went on active duty and was commissioned as a Captain into the Royal Fusiliers (City of London Regiment). He was among the founders of the 47th (London) Infantry Division School of Battle Drill in 1941, and was appointed chief instructor at the new GHQ Home Forces Battle School at Barnard Castle early in 1942. Promoted to Major, he was assigned to the 5th Army Corps deployed in Italy. 

After the Italian capitulation of 1943, British and American troops quickly conquered Sicily and moved up the Italian mainland. The British and Commonwealth Army advanced on the Italian east coast, while the Americans had the west. However, by winter 1943 the advance was at a standstill at the Gustav line, in central Italy. 

While in the Abruzzi region, Wigram quickly sympathized with Ettore Troilo, the Italian partisan leader, and successfully helped him to achieve the goal of having Italian paramilitary force fighting with the Allied Forces against the Germans. At the time the Italian forces were still viewed as a potential source of problems, and although they were officially won to the cause the Allied had little or no confidence in them.  Wigram managed to overcome the diffidence of the British and American military leaders who had in mind to use Italian troops (regular or partisans) as auxiliary forces. This resulted in the creation of the Volunteer Corps of the Maiella Brigade. The joint military force of British and Italian troops was nicknamed "Wigforce".

Wigram was killed in action while leading the Wigforce during the hapless attack at Pizzoferrato village in the Abruzzi region; he is interred at Moro River Canadian War Cemetery (XVI.B.9 Camp) in Ortona.

Wigram's Theory

At the outbreak of the Second World War British Army battle drill – developed during the First World War and revived by the then Lieutenant-General Harold Alexander in I Corps after the evacuation of Dunkirk – was the method of teaching infantry minor tactics. Wigram played the leading part in spreading this training technique to the whole of the Home Army. While studying his troops he concluded that on average a British Army platoon would almost invariably be 25% "gutful," men who would go anywhere and do anything, 50% "sheep," men who would follow closely behind if well led, and about 25% "cowards," who quickly ran or became ineffectual once the fighting started.

Legacy
Lionel Wigram (born 1961), the British film producer and screenplay writer based in Los Angeles, was named after his paternal grandfather, Maj Lionel Wigram.

References 
Notes

Bibliography
Forman, Denis (2008) [1993] To Reason Why, Abacus. .
 Patricelli, Marco (2005) I banditi della libertà : la straordinaria storia della Brigata Maiella, partigiani senza partito e soldati senza stellette ("Bandits of freedom: The extraordinary story of the Maiella Brigade, partisans without party and soldiers and without insignia"), Torino: Academic Press. . (in Italian)

Further reading
 Place, Harrison (2000)  Military Training in the British Army 1940–44, Frank Cass. .
 Place, Harrison (2000) "Lionel Wigram, battle drill and the British Army in the Second World War inWar in History, v.7, n.4, pp.442–462.
 Shephard, Ben (2003) A War of Nerves, Cambridge, Massachusetts: Harvard University Press. .

1907 births
1944 deaths
Military personnel from Sheffield
People educated at King Edward VII School, Sheffield
Alumni of The Queen's College, Oxford
Royal Fusiliers officers
British Army personnel killed in World War II
English Jews